The Calicut Medical Journal is an online open access medical journal published by the Calicut Medical College Alumni Association that was established in 2003. The founding editor-in-chief was P.V. Ramachandran. The current editor is Varghese Thomas. The journal is indexed by CAB International. It was established to provide local physicians an opportunity to report their research findings to an international audience.

References

External links
 

Open access journals
Publications established in 2003
General medical journals
Education in Kozhikode